Andre Anderson or Andre Andersen may refer to:

Andre Anderson (boxer) (1890–1926), American boxer
André Anderson (American football, born 1988), American football player
André Anderson (footballer) (born 1999), Brazilian association football player
André Andersen (born 1961), Russian instrumentalist and composer
Andre Anderson (gridiron football, born 1955), Canadian gridiron football player

See also
Andree Anderson (active 1957–1959), American figure skater